Sheila Gertrude Mackie (1928-2010) was an English artist, illustrator and teacher from Consett, County Durham.

She was born in Chester-le-Street, and studied art at King's College in Newcastle (now Newcastle University). She taught art at Consett Grammar School, where she was head of department from 1950, and also spent many months painting and working at Bertram Mills Circus. In later life she lived at Shotley Bridge where she painted in a caravan studio.

Several of her paintings were bought by the then Derwentside District Council, and are now owned by Durham County Council.

Her Platform 4, Newcastle Station was bought in 1953 for the Government Art Collection.

She illustrated books including Julian Glover's Beowulf, Magnus Magnusson's book on the island of Lindisfarne, and books by naturalist David Bellamy.

In 2001 an exhibition of Mackie's work was held at the Durham Art Gallery: it was called "Through the Eyes of a Dragon" because she was born in the Chinese year of the dragon.

Mackie died on 13 September 2010. She had two children and two grandchildren and was divorced.

Selected publications

References

External links
 Showing seven of her paintings

1928 births
2010 deaths
English women painters
People from Consett
People from Chester-le-Street
Alumni of King's College, Newcastle
20th-century English painters
21st-century English painters
People from Shotley Bridge
20th-century English women
21st-century English women